Henri Laurila is a Finnish professional ice hockey defenceman who currently plays for Rote Teufel Bad Nauheim of the German DEL2.

Career statistics

External links

Living people
Finnish ice hockey defencemen
1980 births
Asiago Hockey 1935 players
Espoo Blues players
Ilves players
KalPa players
Lahti Pelicans players
Modo Hockey players
Peliitat Heinola players
Rote Teufel Bad Nauheim players
SHC Fassa players
Sportspeople from Lahti